Kohkwang Football Club (Thai สโมสรฟุตบอลเกาะขวาง), is a Thai football club based in Chanthaburi, Thailand. The club is currently playing in the Thai League 3 Eastern region.

Record

Players

Current squad

References

 https://www.youtube.com/watch?v=vHAwtlWuV9o

External links
 official website

Association football clubs established in 2015
Football clubs in Thailand
2015 establishments in Thailand